In mathematics, Hermite's cotangent identity is a trigonometric identity discovered by Charles Hermite.  Suppose a1, ..., an are complex numbers, no two of which differ by an integer multiple of .  Let

 

(in particular, A1,1, being an empty product, is 1).  Then

 

The simplest non-trivial example is the case n = 2:

Notes and references 

Trigonometry